Servaes can refer to:

 Albert Servaes (1883–1966), Belgian expressionist painter
 Dagny Servaes (1894–1961), German-Austrian stage and film actress
 Gil Servaes (born 1988), Belgian football player
 Michiel Servaes (1972), Dutch politician
 Reginald Servaes (1893-1978), vice admiral of the British Royal Navy
 Servaes de Koninck (1653/4 – c.1701), baroque composer from the Netherlands